D18 may refer to:
 D-18 guitar
 , a Cannon-class destroyer escort of the Brazilian Navy
 Darmstadt D-18, a German sportsplane
 Dublin 18, a postal district in Ireland
 , a County-class destroyer of the Royal Navy
 , an Attacker-class escort carrier of the Royal Navy
 , a Battle-class destroyer of the Royal Navy
 Jodel D18, a French ultralight aircraft
 LNER Class D18, a steam locomotive class
 Progress D-18, a turbofan engine